The East Berlin Formation is an Early Jurassic geological formation in New England, United States. Dinosaur footprints and trackways are abundant in this formation. These tracks include Eubrontes (belonging to medium-sized-theropods like Dilophosaurus), Anchisauripus (belonging to small theropods like Coelophysis), and Anomoepus (belonging to indeterminate small ornithischians). Several museums, parks, and tourist attractions are based around the East Berlin Formation's dinosaur tracks, including Dinosaur State Park in Rocky Hill, Connecticut and Powder Hill Dinosaur Park in Middlefield, Connecticut.

Although the East Berlin Formation was originally intended to apply to the Hartford Basin of Connecticut and Massachusetts, equivalent strata is found elsewhere in the Newark Supergroup. Equivalent formations include the Waterfall Formation (Culpeper Basin; Virginia, Maryland), Towaco Formation (Newark Basin; New Jersey), White Oaks Formation (Pomperaug Basin, Connecticut), and Turner Falls Sandstone (Deerfield Basin, Massachusetts).

See also

 List of dinosaur-bearing rock formations
 List of stratigraphic units with ornithischian tracks
 Indeterminate ornithischian tracks

Footnotes

References
 Weishampel, David B.; Dodson, Peter; and Osmólska, Halszka (eds.): The Dinosauria, 2nd, Berkeley: University of California Press. 861 pp. .

Jurassic Massachusetts
Jurassic Connecticut